On 20 July 1944, Claus von Stauffenberg and other conspirators attempted to assassinate Adolf Hitler, Führer of Nazi Germany, inside his Wolf's Lair field headquarters near Rastenburg, East Prussia, now Kętrzyn, in present-day Poland. The name "Operation Valkyrie"—originally referring to part of the conspiracy—has become associated with the entire event.

The apparent aim of the assassination attempt was to wrest political control of Germany and its armed forces from the Nazi Party (including the SS) and to make peace with the Western Allies as soon as possible. The details of the conspirators' peace initiatives remain unknown, but they would have included unrealistic demands for the confirmation of Germany's extensive annexations of European territory.

The plot was the culmination of efforts by several groups in the German resistance to overthrow the Nazi German government. The failure of the assassination attempt and the intended military , or putsch, that was to follow led the Gestapo to arrest more than 7,000 people, 4,980 of whom were executed.

Background 

Since 1938, there had been groups plotting an overthrow of some kind within the German Army and in the German Military Intelligence Organization. Early leaders of these plots included Major General Hans Oster, Colonel General Ludwig Beck and Field Marshal Erwin von Witzleben. Oster was the deputy head of the Military Intelligence Office. Beck was a former Chief of Staff of the German Army High Command (OKH). Von Witzleben was the former commander of the German 1st Army and the former Commander-in-Chief of the German Army Command in the West. They soon established contacts with several prominent civilians, including Carl Goerdeler, the former mayor of Leipzig, and Helmuth James von Moltke, the great-grandnephew of Moltke the Elder, hero of the Franco-Prussian War.

Groups of military plotters exchanged ideas with civilian, political, and intellectual resistance groups in the Kreisauer Kreis (which met at the von Moltke estate in Kreisau) and in other secret circles. Moltke was against killing Hitler; instead, he wanted him placed on trial. Moltke said, "we are all amateurs and would only bungle it". Moltke also believed killing Hitler would be hypocritical: Hitler and National Socialism had turned wrongdoing into a system, something which the resistance should avoid.

Plans to stage an overthrow and prevent Hitler from launching a new world war were developed in 1938 and 1939, but were aborted because of the indecision of Army General Franz Halder and Field Marshal Walther von Brauchitsch, and the failure of the Western powers to oppose Hitler's aggression until 1939.

In 1942, a new conspiratorial group formed, led by Colonel Henning von Tresckow, a member of Field Marshal Fedor von Bock's staff, who commanded Army Group Centre in Operation Barbarossa. Tresckow systematically recruited oppositionists into the Group's staff, making it the nerve centre of the army resistance. Little could be done against Hitler as he was heavily guarded, and none of the plotters could get near enough to him.

During 1942, Oster and Tresckow nevertheless succeeded in rebuilding an effective resistance network. Their most important recruit was General Friedrich Olbricht, head of the General Army Office headquarters at the Bendlerblock in central Berlin, who controlled an independent system of communications to reserve units throughout Germany. Linking this asset to Tresckow's resistance group in Army Group Centre created a viable coup apparatus.

In late 1942, Tresckow and Olbricht formulated a plan to assassinate Hitler and stage an overthrow during Hitler's visit to the headquarters of Army Group Centre at Smolensk in March 1943, by placing a bomb on his plane (Operation Spark). The bomb failed to detonate, and a second attempt a week later with Hitler at an exhibition of captured Soviet weaponry in Berlin also failed. These failures demoralised the conspirators. During 1943 Tresckow tried without success to recruit senior army field commanders such as Field Marshal Erich von Manstein and Field Marshal Gerd von Rundstedt, to support a seizure of power. Tresckow, in particular, worked on his Commander-in-Chief of Army Group Centre, Field Marshal Günther von Kluge, to persuade him to move against Hitler and at times succeeded in gaining his consent, only to find him indecisive at the last minute. However, despite their refusals, none of the Field Marshals reported their treasonous activities to the Gestapo or Hitler.

Motivation and goals

Opposition to Hitler and to Nazi policies 
While the main goal of the plotters was to remove Hitler from power, they did so for various reasons. The majority of the group behind the 20 July plot were conservative nationalists—idealists, but not necessarily of a democratic stripe. Martin Borschat portrays their motivations as a matter of aristocratic resentment, writing that the plot was mainly carried out by conservative elites who were initially integrated by the Nazi government but during the war lost their influence and were concerned about regaining it. However, at least in Stauffenberg's case, the conviction that Nazi Germany's atrocities against civilians and prisoners of war were a dishonour to the nation and its military was likely a major motivating factor. Historian Judith Michel assesses the circle around the 20 July Group as a diverse and heterogeneous group that included liberal democrats, conservatives, social democrats, authoritarian aristocrats, and even communists.  The common goal was to overthrow Hitler's regime and bring the war to a swift end. There is evidence of the plot encompassing a broad spectrum of plotters which included Communists in that in April, prior to the attempted coup, Stauffenberg agreed to cooperate with the Operational Leadership of the KPD (Communist Party of Germany) remaining in Germany. Contacts were established through the Social Democrats Adolf Reichwein and Julius Leber.

Territorial demands 
Among demands initially countenanced by the plotters for issue towards the Allies were such points as re-establishment of Germany's 1914 boundaries with Belgium, France and Poland and no reparations. Plotters' demands meant a return to pre-1939 German borders; it seems highly unlikely that the Allies would have accepted such enormous demands. Like most of the rest of German resistance, the 20 July plotters believed in the idea of Greater Germany and as a condition for peace demanded that the western allies recognize as a minimum the incorporation of Austria, Alsace-Lorraine, Sudetenland, and the annexation of Polish-inhabited territories that Germany ceded to Poland after 1918, with the restoration of some of the overseas colonies. They believed that Europe should be controlled under German hegemony.

The overall goals towards Poland were mixed within the plotters. Most of the plotters found it desirable to restore the old German borders of 1914, while others pointed out that the demands were unrealistic and amendments had to be made. Some like Friedrich-Werner Graf von der Schulenburg even wanted all of Poland annexed to Germany.

To Poland, which was fighting against Nazi Germany with both its army and government in exile, the territorial demands and traditional nationalistic visions of resistance were not much different from the racist policies of Hitler. Stauffenberg, as one of the leaders of the plot, stated five years before the coup in 1939 during the Poland campaign: "It is essential that we begin a systemic colonisation in Poland. But I have no fear that this will not occur."

Political vision of post-Hitler Germany 
Many members of the plot had helped the Nazis gain power and shared revisionist foreign policy goals pursued by Hitler, and even at the time of the plot were anti-democratic, hoping to replace Hitler with a conservative-authoritarian government involving aristocratic rule. They opposed popular legitimation or mass participation in governance of the state.

Planning a coup

Von Stauffenberg joins 
By mid-1943, the tide of war was turning decisively against Germany. The army plotters and their civilian allies became convinced that Hitler should be assassinated, so that a government acceptable to the western Allies could be formed, and a separate peace negotiated in time to prevent a Soviet invasion of Germany. In August 1943, Tresckow met, for the first time, a young staff officer named Lieutenant Colonel Claus von Stauffenberg. Severely wounded in North Africa, Claus von Stauffenberg was a political conservative and zealous German nationalist.

From early 1942, he had come to share two basic convictions with many military officers: that Germany was being led to disaster and that Hitler's removal from power was necessary. After the Battle of Stalingrad in December 1942, despite his religious scruples, he concluded that the Führer's assassination was a lesser moral evil than Hitler's remaining in power. Stauffenberg brought a new tone of decisiveness to the ranks of the resistance movement. When Tresckow was assigned to the Eastern Front, Stauffenberg took charge of planning and executing the assassination attempt.

New plan 

Olbricht now put forward a new strategy for staging a coup against Hitler. The Replacement Army (Ersatzheer) had an operational plan called Operation Valkyrie, which was to be used in the event that the disruption caused by the Allied bombing of German cities would cause a breakdown in law and order, or an uprising by the millions of forced labourers from occupied countries now being used in German factories. Olbricht suggested that this plan could be used to mobilise the Reserve Army for the purpose of the coup.

In August and September 1943, Tresckow drafted the "revised" Valkyrie plan and new supplementary orders. A secret declaration began with these words: "The Führer Adolf Hitler is dead! A treacherous group of party leaders has attempted to exploit the situation by attacking our embattled soldiers from the rear in order to seize power for themselves." Detailed instructions were written for occupation of government ministries in Berlin, Heinrich Himmler's headquarters in East Prussia, radio stations and telephone offices, and other Nazi apparatus through military districts, and concentration camps.

Previously, it was believed that Stauffenberg was mainly responsible for the Valkyrie plan, but documents recovered by the Soviet Union after the war and released in 2007 suggest that the plan was developed by Tresckow by autumn of 1943. All written information was handled by Tresckow's wife, Erika, and by Margarethe von Oven, his secretary. Both women wore gloves to avoid leaving fingerprints. On at least two other occasions Tresckow had tried to assassinate the Führer. The first plan was to shoot him during dinner at the army base camp, but this plan was aborted because it was widely believed that Hitler wore a bullet-proof vest. The conspirators also considered poisoning him, but this was not possible because his food was specially prepared and tasted. They concluded that a time bomb was the only option.

Operation Valkyrie could only be put into effect by General Friedrich Fromm, commander of the Reserve Army, so he had to be either won over to the conspiracy or in some way neutralised if the plan was to succeed.

Previous failed attempts 

During 1943 and early 1944 von Tresckow and von Stauffenberg organised at least five attempts to get one of the military conspirators near enough to Hitler, for long enough to kill him with hand grenades, bombs, or a revolver:
 13 March 1943 by von Tresckow
 21 March 1943 by Rudolf Christoph Freiherr von Gersdorff
 late November 1943 by Axel Freiherr von dem Bussche-Streithorst
 February 1944 by Ewald-Heinrich von Kleist-Schmenzin
 11 March 1944 by Eberhard Freiherr von Breitenbuch

As the war situation deteriorated, Hitler no longer appeared in public and rarely visited Berlin. He spent most of his time at his headquarters at the  near Rastenburg in East Prussia, with occasional breaks at his Bavarian mountain retreat Obersalzberg near Berchtesgaden. In both places, he was heavily guarded and rarely saw people he did not know or trust. Himmler and the Gestapo were increasingly suspicious of plots against Hitler and rightly suspected the officers of the General Staff, which was indeed the source of many conspiracies against him.

Preparations 
By the summer of 1944, the Gestapo was closing in on the conspirators. When Stauffenberg sent Tresckow a message through Lieutenant Heinrich Graf von Lehndorff-Steinort asking whether there was any reason for trying to assassinate Hitler given that no political purpose would be served, Tresckow's response was: "The assassination must be attempted, coûte que coûte [whatever the cost]. Even if it fails, we must take action in Berlin ⁠,⁠ ⁠for the practical purpose no longer matters; what matters now is that the German resistance movement must take the plunge before the eyes of the world and of history. Compared to that, nothing else matters."

Himmler had at least one conversation with a known oppositionist when, in August 1943, the Prussian Finance Minister Johannes Popitz, who was involved in Goerdeler's network, came to see him and offered him the support of the opposition if he would make a move to displace Hitler and secure a negotiated end to the war. Nothing came of this meeting, but Popitz was not immediately arrested (although he was later executed towards the end of the war), and Himmler apparently did nothing to track down the resistance network which he knew was operating within the state bureaucracy. It is possible that Himmler, who by late 1943 knew that the war was unwinnable, allowed the plot to go ahead in the belief that if it succeeded he would be Hitler's successor, and could then bring about a peace settlement.

Popitz was not alone in seeing Himmler as a potential ally. General von Bock advised Tresckow to seek his support, but there is no evidence that he did so. Goerdeler was apparently also in indirect contact with Himmler via a mutual acquaintance, Carl Langbehn. Wilhelm Canaris biographer Heinz Höhne suggests that Canaris and Himmler were working together to bring about a change of regime, but this remains speculation.

Tresckow and the inner circle of plotters had no intention of removing Hitler just to see him replaced by the dreaded and ruthless SS chief, and the plan was to kill them both if possible—to the extent that Stauffenberg's first attempt on 11 July was aborted because Himmler was not present.

Countdown to Stauffenberg's attempt

First week of July 
On Saturday, 1 July 1944 Stauffenberg was appointed Chief of Staff to General Fromm at the Reserve Army headquarters on Bendlerstraße in central Berlin. This position enabled Stauffenberg to attend Hitler's military conferences, either at the Wolfsschanze in East Prussia or at Berchtesgaden, and would thus give him an opportunity, perhaps the last that would present itself, to kill Hitler with a bomb or a pistol. Meanwhile, new key allies had been gained. These included General Carl-Heinrich von Stülpnagel, the German military commander in France, who would take control in Paris when Hitler was killed, and it was hoped, negotiate an immediate armistice with the invading Allied armies.

Aborted attempts 
The plot was now fully prepared. On 7 July 1944 General Helmuth Stieff was to kill Hitler at a display of new uniforms at Klessheim castle near Salzburg. However, Stieff felt unable to kill Hitler. Stauffenberg now decided to do both, assassinate Hitler and to manage the plot in Berlin.

On 14 July Stauffenberg attended Hitler's conferences carrying a bomb in his briefcase, but because the conspirators had decided that Heinrich Himmler and Hermann Göring should be killed simultaneously if the planned mobilisation of Operation Valkyrie was to have a chance to succeed, he held back at the last minute because Himmler was not present. In fact, it was unusual for Himmler to attend military conferences.

The plan was for Stauffenberg to plant the briefcase with the bomb in Hitler's conference room with a timer running, excuse himself from the meeting, wait for the explosion, then fly back to Berlin and join the other plotters at the Bendlerblock. Operation Valkyrie would be mobilised, the Reserve Army would take control of Germany and the other Nazi leaders would be arrested. Beck would be appointed provisional head of state, Goerdeler would be chancellor, and Witzleben would be commander-in-chief of the armed forces.

Again on 15 July, the attempt was called off at the last minute. Himmler and Göring were present, but Hitler was called out of the room at the last moment. Stauffenberg was able to intercept the bomb and prevent its discovery.

20 July 1944

Operation Valkyrie 

On 18 July rumours reached Stauffenberg that the Gestapo had knowledge of the conspiracy and that he might be arrested at any time—this was apparently not true, but there was a sense that the net was closing in and that the next opportunity to kill Hitler must be taken because there might not be another. On the morning of Thursday, 20 July Stauffenberg flew back to the Wolfsschanze for another Hitler military conference, once again with a bomb in his briefcase.

At around 12:30 pm as the conference began, Stauffenberg asked to use a washroom in Wilhelm Keitel's office, saying that he had to change his shirt, which indeed was soaked through with sweat, it being a very hot day. There, assisted by von Haeften, he used pliers to crush the end of a pencil detonator inserted into a  block of plastic explosive wrapped in brown paper, that was prepared by Wessel von Freytag-Loringhoven. The pencil detonator consisted of a thin copper tube containing cupric chloride that would take about ten minutes to silently eat through wire holding back the firing pin from the percussion cap. It was slow going due to war wounds that had cost Stauffenberg an eye, his right hand, and two fingers on his left hand. Interrupted by a guard knocking on the door advising him that the meeting was about to begin, he was not able to prime the second bomb, which he gave to his , Werner von Haeften.

Stauffenberg placed the single primed bomb inside his briefcase and, with the unwitting assistance of Major Ernst John von Freyend, entered the conference room containing Hitler and 20 officers, positioning the briefcase under the table near Hitler. After a few minutes, Stauffenberg received a planned telephone call and left the room. It is presumed that Colonel Heinz Brandt, who was standing next to Hitler, used his foot to move the briefcase aside by pushing it behind the leg of the conference table, thus unwittingly deflecting the blast from Hitler but causing the loss of one of his legs and his own demise when the bomb detonated.

At 12:42 the bomb detonated, demolishing the conference room and killing a stenographer instantly. More than 20 people in the room were injured with three officers later perishing. Hitler survived, as did everyone else who was shielded from the blast by the conference table leg. His trousers were singed and tattered (see photograph below) and he suffered from a perforated eardrum, as did most of the other 24 people in the room.

Escape from the Wolf's Lair and flight to Berlin 
Stauffenberg was seen leaving the conference building by Kurt Salterberg, a soldier on guard duty who did not consider this out of the ordinary as attendees sometimes left to collect documents. He then saw a "massive" cloud of smoke, wood splinters and paper and men being hurled through a window and door. Stauffenberg, upon witnessing the explosion and smoke, erroneously assumed that Hitler was dead. He then climbed into a staff car with his aide Werner von Haeften and managed to bluff his way past three checkpoints to exit the  complex. Werner von Haeften then tossed the second unprimed bomb into the forest as they made a dash for Rastenburg airfield, reaching it before it could be realised that Stauffenberg could be responsible for the explosion. By 13:00 he was airborne in a Heinkel He 111 arranged by General Eduard Wagner.

By the time Stauffenberg's aircraft reached Berlin about 16:00, General Erich Fellgiebel, an officer at the  who was in on the plot, had phoned the Bendlerblock and told the plotters that Hitler had survived the explosion. As a result, the plot to mobilise Operation Valkyrie would have no chance of succeeding once the officers of the Reserve Army knew that Hitler was alive. There was more confusion when Stauffenberg's aircraft landed and he phoned from the airport to say that Hitler was in fact dead. The Bendlerblock plotters did not know whom to believe.

Finally, at 16:00 Olbricht issued the orders for Operation Valkyrie to be mobilised. The vacillating General Fromm, however, phoned Field Marshal Wilhelm Keitel at the Wolf's Lair and was assured that Hitler was alive. Keitel demanded to know Stauffenberg's whereabouts. This told Fromm that the plot had been traced to his headquarters and that he was in mortal danger. Fromm replied that he thought Stauffenberg was with Hitler.

Meanwhile, Carl-Heinrich von Stülpnagel, military governor of occupied France, managed to disarm the SD and SS and captured most of their leadership. He travelled to Günther von Kluge's headquarters and asked him to contact the Allies, only to be informed that Hitler was alive. At 16:40 Stauffenberg and Haeften arrived at the Bendlerblock. Fromm, presumably to protect himself, changed sides and attempted to have Stauffenberg arrested. Olbricht and Stauffenberg restrained him at gunpoint and Olbricht then appointed General Erich Hoepner to take over his duties.

By this time Himmler had taken charge of the situation and had issued orders countermanding Olbricht's mobilisation of Operation Valkyrie. In many places the coup was going ahead, led by officers who believed that Hitler was dead. In Vienna, Prague, and many other places troops occupied Nazi Party offices and arrested Gauleiters and SS officers.

Failure of the coup 

At around 18:10, the commander of Military District III (Berlin), General Joachim von Kortzfleisch, was summoned to the Bendlerblock; he angrily refused Olbricht's orders, kept shouting "the Führer is alive", was arrested, and held under guard. General Karl Freiherr von Thüngen was appointed in his place but proved to be of almost no help. General Fritz Lindemann, who was supposed to make a proclamation to the German people over the radio, failed to appear and as he held the only copy, Beck had to work on a new one.

At 19:00, Hitler was sufficiently recovered to make phone calls. He called Goebbels at the Propaganda Ministry. Goebbels arranged for Hitler to speak to Major Remer, commander of the troops surrounding the Ministry. After assuring him that he was still alive, Hitler ordered Remer to regain control of the situation in Berlin. Major Remer ordered his troops to surround and seal off the Bendlerblock, but not to enter the buildings. At 20:00 a furious Witzleben arrived at the Bendlerblock and had a bitter argument with Stauffenberg, who was still insisting that the coup could go ahead. Witzleben left shortly afterwards. At around this time the planned seizure of power in Paris was aborted when Field Marshal Günther von Kluge, who had recently been appointed commander-in-chief in the west, learned that Hitler was alive.

As Remer regained control of the city and word spread that Hitler was still alive, the less resolute members of the conspiracy in Berlin began to change sides. Fromm was freed from his room and fighting broke out in the Bendlerblock between officers supporting and opposing the coup; Stauffenberg was wounded after a shootout. As the fighting was still ongoing, Remer and his forces arrived at the Bendlerblock and the conspirators were overwhelmed and arrested; by 23:00 Fromm and Remer had regained control of the building.

Perhaps hoping that a show of zealous loyalty would save him, Fromm convened an impromptu court martial consisting of himself, and sentenced Olbricht, Stauffenberg, Haeften and another officer, Albrecht Mertz von Quirnheim, to death, while putting Beck under arrest; Beck, realising the situation was hopeless, asked for a pistol and shot himself—the first of many attempted suicides in the coming days. At first Beck only seriously wounded himself—he was then shot in the neck and killed by soldiers. Despite protests from Remer (who had been ordered by Hitler to arrest the conspirators), at 00:10 on 21 July the four officers were executed in the courtyard outside, possibly to prevent them from revealing Fromm's involvement. Others would have been executed as well, but at 00:30 Waffen-SS personnel led by Obersturmbannführer Otto Skorzeny arrived and further executions were forbidden.

Aftermath 

Over the following weeks, Himmler's Gestapo, driven by a furious Hitler, rounded up nearly everyone who had the remotest connection with the plot. The discovery of letters and diaries in the homes and offices of those arrested revealed the plots of 1938, 1939, and 1943, and this led to further rounds of arrests, including that of colonel general Franz Halder, who finished the war in a concentration camp. Under Himmler's new  (blood guilt) laws, many relatives of the principal plotters were also arrested in the immediate aftermath of the failed plot.

More than 7,000 people were arrested and 4,980 were executed. Not all of them were connected with the plot, since the Gestapo used the occasion to settle scores with many other people suspected of opposition sympathies. Alfons Heck, former Hitler Youth member and later a historian, describes the reaction many Germans felt to the punishments of the conspirators:

Allied radio stations also speculated on who the possible remaining suspects could be, many of whom were eventually implicated in the plot.

Very few of the plotters tried to escape or to deny their guilt when arrested. Those who survived interrogation were given perfunctory trials before the People's Court, a kangaroo court that always decided in favour of the prosecution. The court's president, Roland Freisler, was a fanatical Nazi seen shouting furiously and insulting the accused in the trial, which was filmed for propaganda purposes. The plotters were stripped of their uniforms and given old, shabby clothing to humiliate them for the cameras. The officers involved in the plot were "tried" before the Court of Military Honour, a drumhead court-martial that merely considered the evidence furnished to it by the Gestapo before expelling the accused from the Army in disgrace and handing them over to the People's Court.

The first trials were held on 7 and 8 August 1944. Hitler had ordered that those found guilty should be "hanged like cattle". Many people took their own lives prior to either their trial or their execution, including Kluge, who was accused of having knowledge of the plot beforehand and not revealing it to Hitler. Stülpnagel tried to commit suicide, but survived and was hanged.

Tresckow killed himself the day after the failed plot by use of a hand grenade in no man's land between Russian and German lines. 
Fabian von Schlabrendorff remembers Tresckow saying the following before his death:

Fromm's attempt to win favour by executing Stauffenberg and others on the night of 20 July had merely exposed his own previous lack of action and apparent failure to report the plot. Having been arrested on 21 July, Fromm was later convicted and sentenced to death by the People's Court. Despite his knowledge of the conspiracy, his formal sentence charged him with poor performance in his duties. He was executed in Brandenburg an der Havel. Hitler personally commuted his death sentence from hanging to the "more honourable" firing squad. Erwin Planck, the son of the famous physicist Max Planck, was executed for his involvement.

The Kaltenbrunner Report to Adolf Hitler dated 29 November 1944 on the background of the plot, states that the Pope was somehow a conspirator, specifically naming Eugenio Pacelli, Pope Pius XII, as being a party in the attempt. Evidence indicates that 20 July plotters Colonel Wessel von Freytag-Loringhoven, Colonel Erwin von Lahousen, and Admiral Wilhelm Canaris were involved in the foiling of Hitler's alleged plot to kidnap or murder Pope Pius XII in 1943, when Canaris reported the plot to Italian counterintelligence officer General Cesare Amè, who passed on the information.

A member of the SA convicted of participating in the plot was Obergruppenführer Wolf-Heinrich Graf von Helldorf, who was the  Police Chief of Berlin and had been in contact with members of the resistance since before the war. Collaborating closely with Arthur Nebe, he was supposed to direct all police forces in Berlin to stand down and not interfere in the military actions to seize the government. However, his actions on 20 July had minimal influence on the events. For his involvement in the conspiracy, he was later arrested, convicted of treason and executed.

After 3 February 1945, when Freisler was killed in an American air raid, there were no more formal trials, but as late as April, with the war weeks away from its end, Canaris' diary was found, and many more people were implicated.  Hans Von Dohnanyi was accused of being the "spiritual leader" of the conspiracy to assassinate Hitler, and executed 6 April 1945.  Dietrich Bonhoeffer, whom Von Dohnanyi had recruited into the Abwehr, was executed 9 April 1945 along with Canaris, Oster, and 4 others. Executions continued to the last days of the war.

Hitler took his survival to be a "divine moment in history", and commissioned a special decoration to be made for each person wounded or killed in the blast. The result was the Wound Badge of 20 July 1944. The badges were struck in three values: gold, silver, and black (the colours denoted the severity of the wounds received by each recipient). A total of 100 badges were manufactured, and 47 are believed to have actually been awarded. Each badge was accompanied by an ornate award document personally signed by Hitler. The badges themselves bore a facsimile of his signature, making them among the rarest decorations to have been awarded by Nazi Germany.

For his role in stopping the coup Major Remer was promoted to colonel and ended the war as a major general. After the war he co-founded the Socialist Reich Party and remained a prominent Neo-Nazi and advocate of Holocaust Denial until his death in 1997.

Philipp von Boeselager, the German officer who provided the plastic explosives used in the bomb, escaped detection and survived the war. He was the second-to-last survivor of those involved in the plot and died on 1 May 2008, aged 90. The last survivor of the 20 July Plot was Ewald-Heinrich von Kleist-Schmenzin, the thwarted plotter of just a few months before. He died on 8 March 2013, aged 90.

Planned government 
The conspirators had earlier designated positions in secret to form a government that would take office after the assassination of Hitler were it to prove successful. Because of the plot's failure, such a government never rose to power and most of its members were executed.

The following were slated for these roles as of July 1944:

 Ludwig Beck – President
 Carl Friedrich Goerdeler – Chancellor
 Wilhelm Leuschner – Vice-Chancellor
 Paul Löbe – President of the Reichstag
 Claus von Stauffenberg – State Secretary
 Julius Leber – Interior Ministry (considered)
 Eugen Bolz – Minister of the Interior (considered)
 Friedrich von der Schulenburg – Foreign Minister (considered)
 Ulrich von Hassell – Foreign Minister (considered)
 Ewald Löser – Minister of Finance
 Friedrich Olbricht – Minister of War
 Erwin von Witzleben – Minister of Defence and Commander-in-Chief of the Wehrmacht
 Hans Oster – President of the Reichskriegsgericht
 Hans Koch – President of the Reichsgericht
 Karl Blessing – President of the Reichsbank (or Minister of Economics)
 Paul Lejeune-Jung – Minister of Economics
 Andreas Hermes – Minister of Agriculture
 Josef Wirmer – Minister of Justice
 Bernhard Letterhaus – Reconstruction Minister
 Henning von Tresckow – Chief of Police
 Carl-Hans Graf von Hardenberg – Prime Minister of Berlin and Brandenburg

Albert Speer was listed in several notes of the conspirators as a possible Minister of Armaments; however, most of these notes stated Speer should not be approached until after Hitler was dead and one conjectural government chart had a question mark beside Speer's name. This most likely saved Speer from arrest by the SS in addition to Speer being one of Hitler's closest and most trusted friends.

Wilhelm, Crown Prince of Germany was also under suspicion as he was touted to be head of state after Hitler.

Erwin Rommel's involvement 

The extent of Generalfeldmarschall Erwin Rommel's involvement in the military's resistance against Hitler or the 20 July plot is difficult to ascertain, as most of the leaders who were directly involved did not survive and limited documentation on the conspirators' plans and preparations exists. Historians' opinions on this matter vary greatly. According to Peter Hoffmann, he had turned into Hitler's resolute opponent and in the end supported the coup (though not the assassination itself). He was even the natural leader of the opposition in France to some extent, considering the fact he had drawn a lot of military and political personnel into his orbit in preparation of a "Western solution". Ralf Georg Reuth thinks that the conspirators perhaps mistook Rommel's ambiguous attitude for approval of the assassination, considering: the conspirators normally did not explicitly mention the assassination; Rommel was very naive and attached to Hitler (who was the personification of National Socialism, which had provided Rommel with a great career) and thus even if Hofacker had mentioned a violent upheaval in Berlin, he would not have interpreted it as an assassination. Thus, Rommel's participation remains ambiguous and the perception of it largely has its source in the subsequent events (especially Rommel's forced suicide) and the accounts by surviving participants.
 
On 15 April 1944 Rommel's new chief of staff, Hans Speidel, arrived in Normandy and reintroduced Rommel to Stülpnagel. Speidel had previously been connected to Carl Goerdeler, the civilian leader of the resistance, but not to the plotters led by Stauffenberg, and only came to the attention of Stauffenberg due to his appointment to Rommel's headquarters. The conspirators felt they needed the support of a field marshal on active duty. Witzleben was a field marshal, but had not been on active duty since 1942. The conspirators gave instructions to Speidel to bring Rommel into their circle.

Speidel met with former foreign minister Konstantin von Neurath and Strölin on 27 May in Germany, ostensibly at Rommel's request, although the latter was not present. Neurath and Strölin suggested opening immediate surrender negotiations in the West, and, according to Speidel, Rommel agreed to further discussions and preparations. Around the same timeframe, however, the plotters in Berlin were not aware that Rommel had reportedly decided to take part in the conspiracy. On 16 May, they informed Allen Dulles, through whom they hoped to negotiate with the Western Allies, that Rommel could not be counted on for support. Three days before the assassination attempt, on 17 July, Rommel's staff car was strafed by an Allied aircraft in France; he was hospitalised with major injuries and incapacitated on 20 July.

Rommel opposed assassinating Hitler. After the war, his widow maintained that he believed an assassination attempt would spark a civil war. According to journalist and author William L. Shirer, Rommel knew about the conspiracy and advocated that Hitler be arrested and placed on trial. The historian Ian Becket argues that "there is no credible evidence that Rommel had more than limited and superficial knowledge of the plot" and concludes that he would not have acted to aid the plotters in the aftermath of the attempt on 20 July, while the historian Ralf Georg Reuth contends that "there was no indication of any active participation of Rommel in the conspiracy." Historian Richard J. Evans concluded that he knew of a plot, but was not involved.

What is not debated are the results of the failed bomb plot of 20 July. Many conspirators were arrested and the dragnet expanded to thousands. Consequently, it did not take long for Rommel to come under suspicion. He was primarily implicated through his connection to Kluge. Rommel's name also came up in confessions made under torture by Stülpnagel and Hofacker, and was included in Goerdeler's papers on a list of potential supporters. Hofacker confessed that Rommel had agreed to demand for Hitler to step down, and if he refused, Rommel would join the other conspirators in deposing Hitler. Rommel was also planned to become a member of the post-Hitler government in papers drawn up by Goerdeler.

Hitler knew it would cause a major scandal on the home front to have the popular Rommel publicly branded as a traitor. With this in mind, he opted to give Rommel the option of suicide via cyanide or a public trial by Freisler's People's Court. Rommel was well aware that being hauled before the People's Court was tantamount to a death sentence. He also knew that if he chose to stand trial, his family would have been severely punished even before the all-but-certain conviction and execution. With this in mind, he committed suicide on 14 October 1944. He was buried with full military honours and his family was spared from persecution; his cause of death did not come to light until after the war.

Criticism

Involvement in war crimes and atrocities 

Involvement of the plotters in war crimes and atrocities has been studied by historians such as Christian Gerlach. Gerlach proved that plotters such as Tresckow and Gersdorff were aware of mass murder happening in the East from at least 1941. He writes: "Especially with reference to the murder of the Jews, [it is said that] 'the SS' had deceived the officers by killing in secret, filing incomplete reports or none at all; if general staff officers protested, the SS threatened them." Gerlach concludes: "This is, of course, nonsense."

Tresckow also "signed orders for the deportation of thousands of orphaned children for forced labor in the Reich"—the so-called . Such actions led historians to question the motives of the plotters, which seemed more concerned with the military situation than with Nazi atrocities and German war crimes. However some others assert that, in such actions, Tresckow had to act out of principle to continue with his coup plans.

Gerlach pointed out that the plotters had "selective moral criteria" and while they were concerned about Jews being exterminated in the Holocaust, they were far less disturbed about mass murder of civilians in the East. To Gerlach, the primary motivation of the plotters was to ensure German victory in the war or at least prevent defeat. Gerlach's arguments were later supported by historian Hans Mommsen, who stated that the plotters were interested above all in military victory. While acknowledging that Tresckow and other 20 July conspirators had been involved in war crimes, Arnold writes that Gerlach's argument is oversimplified. In 2011, Danny Orbach, a Harvard-based historian, wrote that Gerlach's reading of the sources is highly skewed, and, at times, diametrically opposed to what they actually say. In one case, according to Orbach, Gerlach had falsely paraphrased the memoir of the resistance fighter Colonel Rudolf Christoph Freiherr von Gersdorff, and in another case, quoted misleadingly from an SS document. Hence, Orbach concludes that Gerlach's thesis on the German resistance is highly unreliable.

Commemoration and collective memory 
A 1951 survey by the Allensbach Institute revealed that "Only a third of respondents had a positive opinion about the men and women who had tried unsuccessfully to overthrow the Nazi regime."

The "first official memorial service for the resistance fighters of 20 July" was held on the tenth anniversary in 1954. In his speech at the event, Theodor Heuss, the first President of the Federal Republic of Germany, said that "harsh words" were necessary, and that "There have been cases of refusal to carry out orders that have achieved historic greatness." After this speech, public opinion in Germany began to shift.

Nonetheless, a 1956 proposal to name a school after Claus Schenk Graf von Stauffenberg was opposed by a majority of citizens, and, according to Deutsche Welle,

The first all-German commemoration of the event did not take place until 1990. In 2013, the last surviving member of the plot, Ewald-Heinrich von Kleist-Schmenzin, died in Munich. , the resistance fighters are generally considered heroes in Germany, according to Deutsche Welle.

See also 
 Assassination attempts on Adolf Hitler
 Conspiracy theories about Adolf Hitler's death
 The Desert Fox  (film)
 Operation Valkyrie: The Stauffenberg Plot to Kill Hitler
 Stauffenberg (film) (2004)
 Treason (1959 film)
 Valkyrie (2008 film)
 Walter Gramsch
 Black Orchestra (boardgame)

References

Notes

Bibliography 

 
 
 
 Carsten, F. L. "The German Generals and Hitler" History Today (Aug 1958) 8#8 pp 556–564.

External links 

 German Opposition to Hitler and the Assassination Attempt of July 20, 1944
 Operation Valkyrie: the Stauffenberg Plot to Kill Hitler (80 min. documentary) 

 
1940s coups d'état and coup attempts
1944 in Germany
Attempted coups in Germany
Catholic resistance to Nazi Germany
Conflicts in 1944
Conspiracies
German resistance to Nazism
July 1944 events
People condemned by Nazi courts
Improvised explosive device bombings in Europe
Building bombings in Germany
Hitler